N1000 series may refer to the following:

 Keikyu N1000 series
 Nagoya Municipal Subway N1000 series